Persicula maculosa is a species of sea snail, a marine gastropod mollusk, in the family Cystiscidae.

References

maculosa
Gastropods described in 1834
Cystiscidae